This list of Euro-Western films includes Western-genre films made in Europe by non-Italian production companies, although the term Euro-Western can sometimes include the Italian-produced Spaghetti Western subgenre.

Several Euro-Western films, nicknamed sauerkraut Westerns because they were made in Germany and shot in Yugoslavia, were derived from stories by novelist Karl May, and were film adaptations of May's work. One of the most popular German Western franchises was the Winnetou series, which featured a Native American Apache hero in the lead role.

Some new Euro-Westerns emerged in the 2010s, including Kristian Levring's The Salvation, Martin Koolhoven's Brimstone, and Andreas Prochaska's The Dark Valley.

List by release date

See also
 List of Spaghetti Western films

References

Further reading
Frayling, Christopher. Spaghetti Westerns: Cowboys and Europeans from Karl May to Sergio Leone. London: Routledge & Keagan Paul, 1981. 
Hughes, Howard. Once Upon a Time in the Italian West: The Filmgoers' Guide to Spaghetti Westerns. London and New York: I.B. Tauris, 2006. 
Riling, Yngve P, The Spaghetti Western Bible. Limited Edition. (Riling, 2011).
Weisser, Thomas. Spaghetti Westerns: The Good, The Bad, and The Violent: A Comprehensive, Illustrated Filmography of 558 Eurowesterns and Their Personnel, 1961–1977. Jefferson, North Carolina: McFarland, 1992.

External links
"Euro-Western" Movies (by Release Date), a comprehensive listing by the Internet Movie Database
Online Database of European Westerns, a MediaWiki-powered encyclopedia of the Spaghetti Western

Lists of films by genre